Ghulam Ahmed Hasan Mohammed Parkar (born 25 October 1955) is a former Indian international cricketer who played in one Test match and 10 One Day Internationals between 1982 and 1984.

The first Indian international cricketer with four initials, Ghulam Parkar earned renown from a very young age as a fielder of superlative quality. While he usually manned cover, he was often a part of Ashok Mankad’s strategy: Mankad played him deceptively back at mid-on, and if the unsuspecting batsman attempted an extra run, Parkar swooped down on the ball and pulled off run outs with his famous direct hits — a skill he had apparently picked up due to years of playing pittu.

Parkar went on the England tour, playing the debut of his career. Opening batting with Sunil Gavaskar. He also played 10 ODIs between 1982 and 1984-85, scoring 165 runs at 18. His finest effort came at Guwahati in 1982-83, when he top-scored with 42 in a total of 178 for 7 against a rampant West Indies.

He also scored 4,167 First-Class runs at 42. He peaked in 1980-81, with 59 and 146 in the semi-final and 121 in the final. The following season he had a run of 148*, 40, 156, 84, 68 in Ranji Trophy; the 156 came in a 421-run opening stand with Gavaskar against Bengal.

In England Ghulam scored 433 runs at 36 with 146 against Yorkshire and 92 against MCC. Back home he slammed 77 against the touring West Indians. He never actually lost form (after the first two seasons his average never dipped below the 35-mark), but still quit at 30.

His brother Zulfiqar kept wickets for Bombay, often playing alongside Ghulam.

Domestic career
He scored 4,167 first-class runs at a batting average of 42 runs per innings. He was famously involved in a 421-run opening partnership against Bengal in the 1981–82 quarter-final. This came after an unbeaten 148 in the same season

International career
Parkar went on the England tour, playing the only Test of his career. Opening the batting with Sunil Gavaskar. He also played 10 ODIs between 1982 and 1984. His finest effort came at Guwahati in 1982–83, when he top-scored with 42 in a total of 178 for 7 against a rampant West Indies.

See also
 Zulfiqar Ahmed Hasan Parkar, brother

References

1955 births
India One Day International cricketers
India Test cricketers
Indian cricketers
West Zone cricketers
Mumbai cricketers
Living people
People from Ratnagiri district
Cricketers from Maharashtra